Khaltipur Railway Station is a railway station on the Howrah–New Jalpaiguri line of the Malda railway division of Eastern Railway zone. It is situated beside National Highway 34 at Silampur, Khaltipur of the Malda district in West Bengal. There are a total 10 passenger trains stop at Khaltipur Railway Station.

References

Railway stations in Malda district
Malda railway division